The 2013 Gardner–Webb Runnin' Bulldogs football team represented Gardner–Webb University in the 2013 NCAA Division I FCS football season. They were led by first-year head coach Carroll McCray and played their home games at Ernest W. Spangler Stadium. They were a member of the Big South Conference. They finished the season 7–5, 2–3 in Big South play to finish in fourth place.

Schedule

Source: Schedule

References

Gardner-Webb
Gardner–Webb Runnin' Bulldogs football seasons
Gardner